Marie-Christin "Friedel" Morgenstern (born 16 August 1993) is a German voice actress. She has dubbed for more than 300 films in her career spanning from 2005 and has also acted in few films and television series. Her elder sister Lydia Morgenstern is also a voice actress. She adopted using Friedel as the stage name following her breakthrough in her dubbing career.

Career 
She began to work as a dubbing artist at the age of nine. She also joined Les Misérables owned Theater des Westens. She has lent voice for popular actresses AnnaSophia Robb and Abigail Breslin in many films during the early part of her career as a dubbing artist. She made her debut as a voice actress at the age of twelve in the 2005 film Charlie and the Chocolate Factory where she dubbed for Abigail Breslin as Violet Brauregard.

She won the German Prize for Synchron for the outstanding young talent of the year in 2007. She received the German Dubbing Award for her dubbing in the 2006 film Little Miss Sunshine where she dubbed for Abigail Breslin.

Filmography

Films 
 Offset (2006)
 Little King Macius (2007)
 Little Big Panda (2011) as Jung Fu
 Monster Family (2017)

Selected dubbing works

References

External links 
 
 

1993 births
Living people
German film actresses
German voice actresses
German television actresses
People from Potsdam